Mount Maunganui College is a state coeducational secondary school and is located 
in Mount Maunganui, New Zealand. It was established in 1958, the same year that Tauranga College was split into Tauranga Boys' College and Tauranga Girls' College. It has many classrooms, a library, two large halls, a 33-metre outdoor swimming pool, basketball court, a large sports field and several netball/tennis courts. There is also a Maori wharenui located on the ground.

Achievements 

In the years 2000, 2005, 2007, 2010 and 2013, Mount Maunganui College competed in the Auckland Stage Challenge competition and won. The 2010 performance also won National Stage Challenge competition.

In 2008 the school performed the highly popular stage musical Back to the 80's at the international standard Baycourt theatre in Tauranga, gaining much acclaim for the professional standard of acting, musical performance by the band and lighting display. The props and costumes were also highly praised, in particular a full scale yellow kit car assembled and repaired by a group of students. Also the school band, who are predominantly jazz focused, took to the task with great dedication helping to make the show a great success.

Sport 

Mount Maunganui College offers a wide range of winter and summer sports, including Athletics, Badminton, Cricket, Cross Country, Golf, Mountain Biking, Hockey, Rugby, Waterpolo and Table Tennis. While fostering the achievements of many higher level sports players the school places particular emphasis on involvement and participation. Highlights of the sporting calendar include the regional sporting tournament week, schoolwide running, swimming and athletics events and an annual sports exchange program with Lynfield College in Auckland.

Facilities 

The school is currently in the process of upgrading and replacing many of the facilities available to the students. New additions include a new canteen, gymnasium, administration block, careers buildings, art, music and commerce block as well as the Resource and Research Centre to replace the old library. There are plans to upgrade the Graphics buildings. All facilities are able to be accessed by disabled persons.

Houses
Mount Maunganui College has 4 houses all named after birds

 Ruru or Morepork (green)
 Takahe (yellow)
 Huia (extinct bird) (blue)
 Kotuku or White Heron (white)

School Safety 

The staff and students of Mount Maunganui College takes student, and teacher, safety seriously. Bullies can find themselves with suspension or many detentions. Anyone who participates in a fight can be expelled. The staff of the school encourage students to report any bullying, or mistreatment.

Main Road 

Tauranga City Council received many complaints concerning the speed limit of the main road outside of the school. However following the death of a student crossing the road in 2008, and subsequent uproar from the community and students, significant changes were made including the reduction of the speed limit from 70 to 50 km/h.

Notable alumni
 
Melanie Nolan - historian
Scott Robertson - All Blacks
Eddie Stokes - All Black
Jessica Rose - Actress, lonelygirl15
David Skilling - former Director of The New Zealand Institute
Jeroen Speak - composer
Steve Braunias - author, columnist, journalist and editor
Joel Shadbolt - Lead singer of L.A.B. - One of NZ’s most popular bands

Notes

Educational institutions established in 1958
Secondary schools in the Bay of Plenty Region
Schools in Tauranga
1958 establishments in New Zealand